Kenyatta Lapoleon Jones (January 18, 1979 – June 9, 2018) was an American football offensive tackle. He was drafted by the New England Patriots in the fourth round of the 2001 NFL Draft. He played college football at South Florida.

Jones was also a member of the Washington Redskins and Tampa Bay Storm.

After starting 11 games for the Patriots in 2002, Jones was placed on the Physically Unable to Perform list at the beginning of the 2003 season.  While on the list, Jones was arrested on October 21, 2003 and charged with allegedly throwing hot tea on his cousin, Mark Paul.  He was released by the Patriots five days later.  While playing for the Tampa Bay Storm of the Arena Football League (AFL) in March 2008, Jones was arrested outside a Tampa, Florida nightclub after attempting to urinate on the dance floor and then shoving the off-duty police officer who threw Jones out of the establishment.  Jones was arrested for battery on a law enforcement officer and resisting arrest.

Jones died in Colorado on June 9, 2018, aged 39. His mother said he died from cardiac arrest.

References

External links
Just Sports Stats

1979 births
2018 deaths
African-American players of American football
Eastside High School (Gainesville, Florida) alumni
Players of American football from Gainesville, Florida
American football offensive tackles
South Florida Bulls football players
South Florida Bulls men's basketball players
New England Patriots players
Washington Redskins players
Tampa Bay Storm players
New York Sentinels players
American men's basketball players